Em 4 Jay is a 2008 Australian drama film directed by Alkinos Tsilimidos. Starring Laura Gordon and Nick Barkla, the story follows the lives of two heroin addicts living in Melbourne's inner suburbs. Em 4 Jay premiered at the Melbourne International Film Festival on 5 August 2006.

Cast
Chloe Armstrong as Bianca
Jonathan auf der Heide as Shopkeeper
Nick Barkla as Jay
David Campbell as Mick
Laura Gordon as Em
Jeremy Lindsay Taylor as Dealer
Hamish Michael as Steve
Kat Stewart as Janey
Jeremy Taylor as Jay's dealer
Chris Pang as Asian Gang Leader (uncredited)
Carlo Diy as Asian Gang Member (uncredited)

Reception
The Age's Jim Schembri gave it two stars. He concludes "Em 4 Jay is a film made with conviction by all those involved, but the cast and crew never overcome a narrative that is dirge-like in its nihilistic predictability." Leigh Paatsch of the Herald Sun gave ittwo and a half stars, saying "All in all, Em 4 Jay scraps it out for a dishonourable draw between daring us not to care and damning us for doing exactly that." George Palathingal of the Sydney Morning Herald gave it three and a half stars. "Em 4 Jay doesn't give you a chance to get bored. It's not the future of Australian cinema or anything like that, but it leaves you both impressed and satisfied." Variety's Russell Edwards gave it a positive review, writing "authenticity makes "Em 4 Jay" a Down Under low-budget triumph."

References

External links

See also
List of Australian films

2008 films
Australian drama films
2008 drama films
2000s English-language films
2000s Australian films